The Ninepin Group or Kwo Chau Islands is a group of 29 islands in the easternmost waters of Hong Kong. The Ninepin Group falls under the jurisdiction of Sai Kung District of Hong Kong.

Islands
The islands of the group include:

 East Ninepin Island (Tung Kwo Chau; 東果洲)
 Lung Shuen Pai or Fo Siu Pai
 Tuen Chau Chai
 Tuen Chau Mei
 Shue Long Chau or Kong Tau Pai
 North Ninepin Island (Pak Kwo Chau; 北果洲)
 Hok Tsai Pai
 Ngan Peng Keng
 Ngan Peng Tau
 North Ninepin Island 
 Sai Chau Mei 
 Tuen Keng
 South Ninepin Island (Nam Kwo Chau; 南果洲)
 Tai Chau - where the Kwo Chau Wan beach is located
 Tai Chau Mei
 Ta Long Pai
 Lai Chi Pai

Geography 
The Ninepin Group features hexagonal vertical rhyolite columns, the volcanic rock resulting from a volcanic eruption near Sai Kung about 140 million years ago. Ninepin Group is extremely eroded due to the heavy tides that wash against the islands every day. It features several sea caves as a result of erosion. For a long time, the Ninepin Group was devoid of human presence. However, there is a temple dedicated to Tin Hau, located on South Ninepin Island for any fishermen who landed on the island.

Conservation
The Ninepin Group Special Area covers 53.1 hectares and was designated in 2011. It consists of the islands that make up the Ninepin Group. The geology of the area is characterised by volcanic rocks of the Cretaceous period.

Transportation 

Because no one lives on Ninepin Group, there is no public transportation to the islands. One must rent a boat in order to reach the Ninepin Group.

See also

 Hong Kong UNESCO Global Geopark

References

External links

    Satellite view on Google Maps

Uninhabited islands of Hong Kong
Sai Kung District
Volcanism of Hong Kong
Hong Kong UNESCO Global Geopark
Underwater diving sites in Hong Kong
Islands of Hong Kong